The 12 pounder 12 cwt anti-aircraft gun was borrowed for AA use from the QF 12 pounder 12 cwt coast defence gun with the addition of a modified cradle for higher elevation, a retaining catch for the cartridge, and an additional spring recuperator above the barrel and high-angle sights. Writers commonly refer to it simply as "12 pounder anti-aircraft gun". 12 cwt referred to the weight of the barrel and breech [12 ×  = ] to differentiate it from other 12-pounder guns.

History
When World War I began Britain had no anti-aircraft artillery and had given little thought to it. Hence in 1914 when Germany occupied parts of Belgium and northern France, it faced the risk of air attack, and various medium calibre guns were adapted to high-angle mountings, including the 12 pdr 12 cwt. All QF 12 pounder ammunition at the time was "Separate loading QF" i.e. the propellant came in a brass cartridge case with primer ready installed, but the shell was loaded separately. For anti-aircraft firing, Fixed QF rounds were quickly developed i.e. with the shell already attached to the cartridge case. This allowed slightly faster loading.

Combat use

For home air defence the gun was typically mounted on a high-angle mounting with an additional spring recuperator above the barrel, on a 2-wheel towed travelling platform,  ×  The 4 stabilising arms at the corners were swung out, rods at the ends screwed down to lift the platform off the wheels which were then removed and the platform lowered to the ground. It was also deployed on static mountings to defend prominent targets such as dockyards.

While the gun was much lighter than the QF 3 inch 20 cwt AA gun, for anti-aircraft use it lacked its range and shell weight. Hence the 3 inch 20 cwt gun became the preferred heavy AA gun on land and ships from 1914 to 1937. The 12 pdr 12 cwt also proved only marginally superior to the much lighter QF 13 pounder 9 cwt as a light AA gun. Comparison:-

At the end of World War I, 36 guns were still in service in the home air defense of Britain, 10 on the Western Front and 2 in Mesopotamia where it was typically mounted on river barges. The gun remained in Royal Navy anti-aircraft use, in the form of the new Mk V version, on smaller ships in World War II because of its low and high angle firing.

Ammunition

See also 
 List of anti-aircraft guns
 QF 12 pounder 12 cwt naval gun

Surviving Examples

There are no surviving examples

Notes and references

Bibliography
 I.V.Hogg & L.F. Thurston, British Artillery Weapons & Artillery 1914-1918. London: Ian Allan, 1972. 
 Brigadier NW Routledge, History of the Royal Regiment of Artillery. Anti-Aircraft Artillery, 1914-55. London: Brassey's, 1994.

External links

 12-pdr (3"/40 (7.62 cm)) 12cwt QF Marks I, II and V

World War I artillery of the United Kingdom
World War I anti-aircraft guns
76 mm artillery
Anti-aircraft guns of the United Kingdom